Rush 2: Extreme Racing USA is a racing video game developed by Atari Games and published by Midway Games exclusively for the Nintendo 64 video game console. It was released on November 10, 1998, in North America, and February 4, 1999, in Europe. Rush 2: Extreme Racing USA is a sequel to San Francisco Rush: Extreme Racing, and the second game in the Rush series.

Development

Cancelled ports
In an advertisement for sweepstakes for San Francisco Rush, it was announced that the second prize winners would receive the N64 or PlayStation version of Rush 2. In a certain commercial, a Windows 95 port was touted, but the game was only released on N64.

Gameplay
The game is notable for the high level of detail in the recreations of the various cities and states used, and for its fast arcade-style physics. The game also features a two-player mode and rumble pack support. Hidden shortcuts and jumps add to the replay value of the game.

Mountain Dew soda cans appear in the game and can be collected to unlock content.

Reception

The game received favorable reviews according to the review aggregation website GameRankings. IGN called the game "a bit on the cheesy side" despite criticism with the presentation and stated that it had "generic menus and the same overall front-end" as San Francisco Rush: Extreme Racing. Next Generation called it "a worthy successor to the original".

References

External links
 

1998 video games
Ed Logg games
Midway video games
Nintendo 64 games
Nintendo 64-only games
Racing video games set in the United States
Video game sequels
Video games developed in the United States
Video games set in Hawaii
Video games set in the Las Vegas Valley
Video games set in Los Angeles
Video games set in New York City
Video games set in San Francisco
Video games set in Seattle
Multiplayer and single-player video games
Video games scored by Barry Leitch
Video games set in Nevada